Friðrik Pétur Ragnarsson (born 9 January 1967) is an Icelandic former basketball player and a coach.

Playing career
Friðrik spent the majority of his career with Njarðvík, where he won the Icelandic national championships 6 times. He retired as a player after the 2001 Úrvalsdeild finals.

Coaching career
Friðrik coached for nine seasons in the Úrvalsdeild karla, winning the national championship in 2001 and 2002.

Icelandic national team
Between 1989 and 1999, Friðrik played 31 games for the Icelandic national team.

Executive career
Friðrik served as the chairman of Njarðvík's basketball department from 2017 to 2019.

Personal life
Friðrik is the father of Icelandic national team member Elvar Már Friðriksson and Úrvalsdeild point guard Ragnar Helgi Friðriksson.

Awards and honours

As player

Club
6x Icelandic League champion (1987, 1991, 1994, 1995, 1998, 2001)
6× Icelandic Basketball Cup (1987–1990, 1992, 1999)
2x Icelandic Supercup (1995, 1999)

Individual
Úrvalsdeild Domestic All-First Team (1999)

As coach
2x Icelandic Men's League champion (2001, 2002)
Icelandic Men's Basketball Cup (2002)
2x Icelandic Men's Supercup (2001, 2002)
2x Icelandic Men's Company Cup (2002, 2009)

References

External links
Úrvalsdeild Statistics

1970 births
Living people
Fridrik Ragnarsson
Fridrik Ragnarsson
Point guards
Fridrik Ragnarsson
Fridrik Ragnarsson
Fridrik Ragnarsson
Fridrik Ragnarsson